Strictosidine is a natural chemical compound and is classified as a glucoalkaloid and a vinca alkaloid. It is formed by the Pictet–Spengler condensation reaction of tryptamine with secologanin, catalyzed by the enzyme strictosidine synthase.  Thousands of strictosidine derivatives are sometimes referred to by the broad phrase of monoterpene indole alkaloids.  Strictosidine is an intermediate in the biosynthesis of numerous pharmaceutically valuable metabolites including quinine, camptothecin, ajmalicine, serpentine, vinblastine, vincristine and mitragynine.

Biosynthetic pathways help to define the subgroups of strictosidine derivatives.

Distribution
Strictosidine is found in the following plant families:
Apocynaceae
Here especially in Rhazya stricta and Catharanthus roseus.
Loganiaceae
Rubiaceae
Icacinaceae
Nyssaceae
Alangiaceae

Recent efforts in metabolic engineering have permitted the synthesis of strictosidine by yeast (Saccharomyces cerevisiae).  This was accomplished by adding 21 genes and 3 gene deletions.

Research
The involvement of the glucoalkaloid strictosidine in the antimicrobial and antifeedant activity of Catharanthus roseus leaves was studied. Strictosidine and its deglucosylation product, specifically formed by the enzyme strictosidine glucosidase, were found to be active against several microorganisms.

References

Indole alkaloids
Glucosides
Vinyl compounds